The 1984 U.S. Open was the 84th U.S. Open, held June 14–18 at Winged Foot Golf Club in Mamaroneck, New York, a suburb northeast of New York City. Fuzzy Zoeller defeated Greg Norman in an 18-hole playoff to win his first U.S. Open title and second major championship.

Arnold Palmer failed to qualify for this U.S. Open, snapping a streak of 31 consecutive Opens played, which began in 1953. The 1960 champion played in one more, at Oakmont in 1994.

This was the fourth U.S. Open at Winged Foot's West Course; it previously hosted in 1929, 1959, and 1974. It later hosted the PGA Championship in 1997 and the U.S. Open in 2006 and 2020.

Course layout
West Course

Lengths of the course for previous majors:

Past champions in the field

Made the cut

Missed the cut

Round summaries

First round
Thursday, June 14, 1984

Second round
Friday, June 15, 1984

Amateurs: Sigel (+1), Fehr (+7), Tentis (+8), Kirby (+9), Case (+10), Mediate (+11), Gallagher (+16), Hadden (+17), Burroughs (+19), Friend (+20), Ludwig (+20).

Third round
Saturday, June 16, 1984

Final round
Sunday, June 17, 1984

Hale Irwin, the 1974 champion at Winged Foot, was the 54-hole leader, but faded in the final round with a 79 to finish in sixth place.  With Irwin's collapse, the tournament became a duel between Zoeller and Norman. Zoeller led Norman by three shots heading to the back-nine, but Norman managed to draw level by the time he reached 18. His approach shot on the last sailed into the grandstand, but he managed to save par by holing a  putt. Zoeller, standing in the 18th fairway, waved a white towel as a playful sign of surrender, then proceeded to par the hole himself to force a playoff. The two finished at 276 (–4), five shots clear of the rest of the field.

Amateurs: Fehr (+14), Sigel (+14).

Scorecard
Final round

Cumulative tournament scores, relative to par

Source:

Playoff
Monday, June 18, 1984

The playoff proved to be no contest. Both birdied the first and Zoeller the 2nd, but Norman double-bogeyed it and fell three strokes behind, and Zoeller carried a five-shot lead at the turn. Network coverage on ABC joined the round in progress, on the back nine at 4 pm EDT.  Zoeller finished with a 67, eight shots better than Norman; this time on 18, it was Norman who waved a white towel in mock surrender. Zoeller's 67 was the lowest round ever recorded in a U.S. Open playoff.

Scorecard

{|class="wikitable" span = 50 style="font-size:85%;
|-
|style="background: Pink;" width=10|
|Birdie
|style="background: PaleGreen;" width=10|
|Bogey
|style="background: Green;" width=10|
|Double bogey
|}
Source:

References

External links
1984 U.S. Open
USGA Championship Database

U.S. Open (golf)
Golf in New York (state)
Mamaroneck, New York
U.S. Open
U.S. Open (golf)
U.S. Open (golf)